Macau is an autonomous territory within China. A Portuguese colony until 1999, Macau has a diverse culture firmly rooted in Cantonese culture, with a mix of influences from East Asia and Western Europe. Macau is known for being the largest gambling center in the world.

People and languages
The two official languages of Macau are Chinese and Portuguese, although the latter is only spoken by a small minority. English is also widely spoken.

In 2018 Reuters stated "there are signs that Chinese is being prioritized in government."

The Macanese language, generally known as Patuá, is a distinctive creole that is still spoken by several dozen members of the Macanese people, an ethnic group of mixed Asian and Portuguese ancestry that accounts for a small percentage of Macau's population.

Signs in Macau are displayed in both Traditional Chinese and Portuguese. In contrast to mainland China, Macau—along with Hong Kong and Taiwan—generally does not use Simplified Chinese characters.

Among the main migrants of the country are skilled workers from the Philippines, hence Tagalog is one of the most-heard foreign languages.

Cultural identity
The worldwide popularity of Cantonese food and Chinese martial arts (kung fu in Cantonese or wu shu in Mandarin) has made them popular in Portugal as well.

In 1998, the first Festival da Lusofonia took place in Macau, a festival of Portuguese-speaking communities. In November 2013, the 16th edition of the festival took place over the duration of two and a half days with musical activities, kids programmes, traditional Portuguese games and food from Portuguese-speaking countries' cuisines.

Mass media

Most of the pop music that can be heard on the channel TDM Teledifusão de Macau (澳廣視) is imported from Hong Kong or overseas (mainly Japan). However, more and more local songs are being recorded by locals. Some Brazilian TV stations are also broadcast in Macau.

Cuisine

Macanese cuisine is a blend of southern Chinese (especially Cantonese cuisine) and Portuguese cuisines, with significant influences from Southeast Asia and the Lusophone world. The most famous snack is the Portuguese-style egg tart. It is widely popular in Southeast Asia, especially in Taiwan and Hong Kong. The most famous Macanese food is galinha à portuguesa, which is served in numerous varieties in Macau restaurants.

In 2018 Reuters stated that the cuisine was one of the few remaining Portuguese influences in Macau.

Religion

The primary religion is Buddhism. Roman Catholicism has considerable influence in education and social welfare in Macau. However, adherents only count for about six percent of the population. Protestantism is spreading quickly, especially among the younger demographic groups.

Arts

Film

A few independent films have been produced since the late 1990s. Some of the well-known productions include:
 窗前熗後 by Vincent Hui (2000)
 Love Is Not A Sin (鍾意無罪) by Doug Chan (2003). Winner of Golden DV Award (27th HKIFF), Winner of The Best Original Screenplay Award (1st Downunder International Film Festival, Darwin).
 macau.xmas.2005 (澳門.聖誕.2005) by Sio (2005).
 Macao 2525 (2021). Nominated for best digital animation at the Film & TV World Cup 2021 at the Lima Web Fest in Peru. 45 nations around the world were involved in the festival with totally 358 films and Macao 2525 was the only represent of Macau.

  The Edge Of Human by Johan Karlberg and Angela Lao (2022). First Macanese Cyberpunk movie, nominated for best experimental film at the Film & TV World Cup 2022 Pinewood Studios Lift Off Sessions in London UK. Finished 4th place of 42 in the final. The winner was EXARCHIA LUTHIERS from Greece, then later was re-elected by a judge and gave the win to the South African film Music Powers.

Music
The Macau International Music Festival is conducted by the Cultural Affairs Bureau of the Macau SAR Government every autumn. The 20th anniversary of the MIMF was celebrated in 2007 with performances of  Jazz, classical music, electronica, Chinese folk-pop, rock and Fado.

Other Lusophone music types popular in Macao are samba, bossa nova, and kizomba.

In 2005, the Hush!! Full Band Festival got established, a government-sponsored modern music festival featuring pop rock and hard rock bands from all over Asia with a focus on Macau bands. The festival is free of charge and it's in its 9th edition in 2013.

Literature

The literature of Macanese (i.e. those with Portuguese descent) is a multi-dimensional art. Their literature appeared as early as the 19th century. At the beginning of the 20th century, a group of well-known writers appeared:
 李安樂的詩集《孤獨之路》 – Anthology "Lonely Road", 《美麗的蛋家女》(TancareiraBela),《沉思的蛋家女》(Tancareira Pensativa)及《蛋家女之歌》(CancāoDe Tancareira) – Leanel Alves.
 若瑟(阿德)的詩集《澳門，受祝福的花園》 – Anthology "Blessed garden, Macau" – Jose dos Santos Ferreira.
 江道蓮的短篇小說集《長衫》 – Short fiction: "The Gown" written by Deolinda de Conceição
 飛歷奇的長篇小說《愛情與小脚趾》和《大辫子的誘惑》 – Long fiction: "Love and small toes" & "The Bewitching Braid" written by Henrique de Senna Fernandes
 馬若龍的詩集《一日中的四季》 – Anthology "Four seasons in one day" – Carlos Marreiros
 Other:
 "Chinese Urheen – 《中國二胡》" Camilo Pessanha (庇山耶) 1867–1926
 "Collection of Cathedral of Saint Paul -《三巴集》" WuLi (清代 • 吳曆) 1632–1718
 Renowned playwright Tang Xianzu (明代 • 湯顯祖 1550–1616). His works covered "XiangAo Meets Jia Hu" – 《香澳逢賈胡》,"Listens to Xiangshan – Translator" one, "Listens to Xiangshan – Translator" two – 《聼香山譯者 1, 2 》, 《香山驗香所採香口號》, "South Haijiang" – 《南海江》 and so on. These works mainly reflected and depicted Macau's local scenery at that time (late Ming dynasty), the human sentiment and international trade.
 "The Chart of Maritime Countries – 《海國圖志》", "Listens to the Dulcimer & Song playing by a foreign lady in the Aomen Garden – 《澳门花园听夷女洋琴歌》" written by WeiYuan (清代 • 魏源 1794–1857), displayed his personal feeling and understanding of classical music.

Cantonese opera

Cantonese opera is quite popular, especially among elderly residents. In 2003, the Cultural Institute of the Macau S.A.R Government, in collaboration with the Leisure and Cultural Services Department of the Hong Kong SAR, organized the exhibition "Fong Yim Fun – The Life and Work of a Cantonese Opera Artiste". As a well-known actress and opera artiste in Canton, Hong Kong and Macau, Fong Yim Fun performed in more than 150 operas and films. Part of her works was exhibited in the Museum of Macau at that time.

Facilities

The Macao Cultural Centre was established in 1999, for the purpose of offering unique venues for artistic events, international conferences and exhibitions, enhancing cultural exchange, and helping to expand culture horizons among Macau residents. Hundreds of programs and events take place there almost every day—e.g., martial arts performances, European traditional music, Chinese traditional music, foreign music, varies types of dancing, etc.

The Macau Ricci Institute is a recent foundation of the Jesuits in Macau. Its aim is to continue the process of friendly encounters between Chinese and European cultures and traditions, which was begun by Matteo Ricci 1552–1610 many years ago.

See also

 Architecture of Macau
 List of museums in Macau
 Lingnan culture

References

External links
 HUSH!! Full Band Festival, official CCM website
 Macau scene overview at RockinChina.com